Arthroschista hilaralis, also known as the kadam defoliator, is a moth in the family Crambidae. It was described by Francis Walker in 1859. It is found in India, Sri Lanka, Burma, Cambodia, Sumatra, Borneo and in Australia, where it has been recorded from Queensland.

References

Moths described in 1859
Spilomelinae
Moths of Asia
Moths of Australia